Craspedacusta is a genus of freshwater hydrozoans in the family Olindiidae.

Species 
The following species are recognized in the genus Craspedacusta:

 Craspedacusta brevinema He & Xu, 2002
 Craspedacusta chuxiongensis He, Xu & Nie, 2000
 Craspedacusta hangzhouensis He, 1980
 Craspedacusta iseanum (Oka & Hara, 1922)
 Craspedacusta kuoi Shieh & Wang, 1959
 Craspedacusta sichuanensis He & Kou, 1984
 Craspedacusta sinensis Gaw & Kung, 1939
 Craspedacusta sowerbii Lankester, 1880
 Craspedacusta vovasi Naumov & Stepanjants, 1971
 Craspedacusta xinyangensis He, 1980
 Craspedacusta ziguiensis He & Xu, 1985

References 

Olindiidae
Hydrozoan genera